Christophe Barbier (born 25 January 1967) is a French political journalist and columnist who was chief editor of L'Express from 2006 to 2016.

Career
Born in Sallanches, Haute-Savoie, Barbier attended the Lycée du Parc in Lyon. He graduated from the École normale supérieure in 1987 and ESCP Europe in Paris in 1992. He worked for Le Point from 1990 to 1995 and Europe 1 from 1995 until 1996. He was promoted that year head of the political service of L'Express.

He became editorial assistant in 2001 and served as chief editor from 2006 to 2016. During that period he was a frequent guest on LCI and i>Télé, as well as the daily TV show C dans l'air broadcast on France 5. He currently works as a news columnist for BFM TV. His book Les Derniers Jours de François Mitterrand was awarded the 2011 Prix Combourg-Chateaubriand.

Books

 Les Derniers Jours de François Mitterrand, Grasset, 1997 (2015) 
 La Comédie des orphelins, Grasset, 2000 
 La guerre de l'Élysée n'aura pas lieu, Grasset, 2001 
 La Saga Sarkozy, Éditions L'Express, 2007 
 Le Bleu de la terre, 2007
 Les Nouveaux Caractères, 2007
 Le vrai pouvoir des francs-maçons, by François Koch (préface), Éditions L'Express, 2009
 L'Express. 60 ans à la une, Éditions de la Martinière, 2011
 Les grands entretiens de l'Express (préface), Éditions L'Express, 2011
 Parrains du siècle : destins et déclins, by Bruno Aubry (préface), Éditions L'Express, 2011
 Maquillages. Les politiques sans fard, 2012 
 Rêvons !, with Marc Jolivet, Flammarion, 2013
 Dictionnaire amoureux du théâtre, Plon, 2015
 Les derniers jours de la gauche, Flammarion, 2017

References

1967 births
Living people
École Normale Supérieure alumni
ESCP Europe alumni
21st-century French journalists
French male journalists
People from Haute-Savoie